Janatha Vimukthi Peramuna (JVP) is a Marxist–Leninist communist party and a former militant organization in Sri Lanka. The movement was involved in two armed uprisings against the government of Sri Lanka: once in 1971 (SLFP), and another in 1987–89 (UNP). The motive for both uprisings was to establish a socialist state.

The JVP was initially a small organisation that became a well-organised party that could influence mainstream politics. Its members campaigned openly for the left-wing coalition government, United Front. Following their disillusion with the coalition, they started an insurrection against the Dominion of Ceylon in early 1971, which intensified following the ban on the party. The military arm the Red Guard captured over 76 police strongholds throughout the island of Ceylon.

The JVP entered democratic politics in 1977 when President J.R. Jayewardene released the JVP leader, Rohana Wijeweera, from prison. After the United Front coalition government collapsed, Wijeweera contested the presidential elections in 1982 and obtained 4.16 percent of the votes cast. Before the elections, he had been convicted through the Criminal Justice Commission (CJC) for conspiring to overthrow the state violently. The JVP launched a more organized insurrection for the second time in 1987 after the Indo-Sri Lanka accord was signed.

Following Operation Combine and Wijeweera's death, the JVP returned to elections as the National Salvation Front. The surviving JVP members campaigned in the 1994 elections, but eventually withdrew and supported the nationalist opposition party, Sri Lanka Freedom Party. In 2004, it joined the government as a part of the United People's Freedom Alliance and supported the government in its war against the Liberation Tigers of Tamil Eelam (LTTE), but subsequently left the coalition government.

Later, it contested under its own national coalition and has since been a prominent third party in overall Sri Lankan politics.

History
The JVP was founded in 1965 to provide a leading force for a Communist revolution in Sri Lanka. In 1965, there were four other leftist political parties: the Lanka Sama Samaja Party (LSSP), established in 1935 as the first political party in Sri Lanka; the Communist Party of Sri Lanka (CPSL), which broke away from the LSSP and formed their own party in 1943 due to differences of opinion on supporting Britain during the 2nd World War; the Mahajana Eksath Peramuna (MEP); and the Peking Left.

Since the country's independence, the two main parties, the United National Party (UNP) and the Sri Lanka Freedom Party (SLFP, which broke away from the UNP in 1951), governed the country for eight years each, and the country's economic outlook worsened. According to the JVP's founders, neither party had been able to implement even a single measure to resolve the crisis. The JVP considered the entry of three left parties into the United Front (UF) of Sri Lanka in 1964 as a conscious betrayal of the aspirations of the people and the working class. Inflation, unemployment, and food prices increased despite government efforts to prevent it.

Rohana Wijeweera

Rohana Wijeweera's father was a political activist of the CPSL. During an election campaign in the 1960s, he was severely assaulted by UNP members and was paralysed; Wijeweera was likely emotionally affected, which may have changed his views and caused his hatred against the UNP. When Wijeweera's further education was threatened as a result of his father's incapacitation, the CPSL arranged a scholarship for him to study medicine at the Patrice Lumumba Friendship University in Moscow, where he read the works of Karl Marx, Friedrich Engels, and Lenin, and became a committed Marxist.

Effects of the Sino–Soviet split
By this time, the United Socialist Party (USP) was divided into two factions: the Chinese faction and the Soviet faction. Wijeweera broke away from the CPC which was aligned with the USSR and joined the Ceylon Communist Party (Maoist).

After a visit to Sri Lanka in 1964, he was not permitted to return to the USSR: his student activism in favour of Maoism while in Moscow displeased the Russians. The Chinese faction was led by Premalal Kumarasiri. Through his father's political activities, Wijeweera contacted Kumarasiri and joined the party's staff and became part of the trade union office.

Split
Wijeweera increasingly felt that the Left movement (generally referred to in Sri Lanka as "old left") that existed until then had not produced enough professional revolutionaries and had never made a meaningful effort to educate the masses on Marxism. Workers accepted the words mouthed by the leaders of the "old left" as the final word. He also believed that the leadership of the "old left", aware of this aspect, utilised it to the fullest to blunt workers' militancy. Wijeweera and others decided in mid-1965 to launch a new party that was explicitly revolutionary in character; it was formed without breaking off from other established parties. The cadres engaged themselves in political activities that consisted mainly of trying to increase the political awareness of the working class.

Five classes
Wijeweera felt that one of the more important tasks was to educate the masses politically. After deliberating on the issue, it was decided that an uncomplicated Marxist analysis of the socio-politico-economic problems of the country should be the introductory step. The Marxist analysis was split into five discussions along with five main themes.

Throughout the rest of 1968, Wijeweera traveled across the country, conducting political classes for the members of the party. An education camp followed the five basic political classes. Precautions had to be taken to keep this educational camp a secret to avoid alarming the government and the "old left". All conducted by Wijeweera, the classes stretched from 17 to 18 hours a day, interrupted only by meals.

By 1971, the JVP established itself as a political party and offered an alternative to those disillusioned with the politics of the other left organizations. Most of the members and supporters of the JVP at the time were young adults. Alarmed at the JVP's political potential and challenge, the government and its leftist allies levelled a variety of slander against it. Many representatives of the "old left" called the JVP members "CIA agents attempting to overthrow the pro-Eastern bloc party".

Full-time organisation

Building cells
JVP built cells in multiple countries, including South Yemen, Belgium, the UK, and Ba'athist Iraq; South Yemen also promised to hold some weapon supplies; although the manufacturer later said that there was no possible way to supply weapons, the government congratulated the organisation with a letter that read "Revolutionary Greetings".

1971 uprising

The 1971 uprising led by the JVP was unsuccessful and allegedly claimed nearly 5,000 lives. The JVP drew worldwide attention when it launched an insurrection against the Bandaranaike government in April 1971. Although the insurgents were young, poorly armed, and inadequately trained, they seized and held major areas in the southern and central provinces of Sri Lanka before they were defeated by the security forces. Their attempt to seize power created a major crisis for the government and forced a fundamental reassessment of the nation's security needs. In March 1971, after an accidental explosion in one of the bomb factories, the police found fifty-eight bombs in a hut in Nelundeniya, Kegalle District. Shortly afterward, Wijeweera was arrested and sent to Jaffna Prison, where he remained throughout the revolt. In response to his arrest and the growing pressure of police investigations, other JVP leaders acted immediately, and started the uprising at 11:00 p.m. on 5 April. After two weeks of fighting, the government regained control of all but a few remote areas. In both human and political terms, the cost of the victory was high: an estimated 30,000 insurgents, according to the JVP, many of them in their teens, died in the conflict. The army and police were also widely perceived to have used excessive force. In order to win over an alienated population and to prevent a prolonged conflict, Bandaranaike offered amnesties in May and June 1971, and the top leaders were imprisoned. Wijeweera, who was already in detention at the time of the uprising, was given a twenty-year sentence.

Insurgency 1987–1989

The Indian intervention through the Indo-Sri Lanka accord and the plan to divide the island led to the 1987–1989 revolt. The JVP exploited the arrival of the Indian Peace-keeping Force and the widespread nationalist sentiments of large sections of the Sinhalese people to terrorise both the state machinery and sections of civil society that opposed its thinking, which almost overpowered the state. Organised in multiple cells countrywide and mostly based around the capital Kandy in the centre, the JVP murdered probably thousands of people and crippled the country with violently enforced hartals (general strikes) for three years. Government forces captured and killed Wijeweera and his deputy in November 1989 in Colombo; by early 1990 they had killed or imprisoned the remaining JVP politburo and detained an estimated 7,000 suspected JVP members. Although the government won a decisive military victory, there were credible accusations of brutality and extrajudicial methods. The number of deaths during the insurgency is uncertain, as the government was also fighting Tamil insurgent groups at the time. Multiple official and unofficial forces and reports confirm that the death toll exceeded 60,000. In addition, many people took advantage of the chaos to instigate deadly local feuds.

What is certain is the methods of death, including necklacing, victims eviscerated and left to die, and even the occasion of eighteen heads arranged around the Alwis pond at the University of Peradeniya, which occurred the day after T.E. Nagahawatte, the Assistant Registrar of the university and a volunteer officer, was killed by two gunmen inside university premises. For genocide studies, it was an example of politicide that happened in a democratic regime, which resulted in the killing of at least 13,000 and 30,000 JVP members and its alleged supporters.

Military organization

The JVP military section which was made up mostly of inadequately trained youths, were responsible for attacks on several locations throughout Ceylon, including on the Jaffna prison, SLAF Ekala and the Wellawaya town in 1971. Later in the 80s, JVP with the assistance of several other militant organisations trained the Patriotic People's Armed Forces. PPAF carried out more well planned attacks such as the attack on the Pallekele detachment. The military section of the JVP in the late 80s were led by the DJV leader Keerthi Vijayabahu.

1971
Despite the lack of training they received, the JVP militants were armed with shotguns, wore blue colored uniforms with boots and helmets, carried haystacks, and ammunition. The primary source of funding were bank robberies.

1987–1989
During its second insurgency, they were armed with stolen weapons such as AK 47, T 56, and .303 British rifles.

International relationships
The JVP has been internationally affiliated to multiple organisations, some of which were the Palestine Liberation Organization (PLO), the National Liberation Front of Yemen, and the Korean Workers' Party (KWP).

North Korea

In the early 1970s, North Korea backed the JVP by supplying training. As a result, diplomatic connections between Sri Lanka and North Korea were cut off and were not re-established. 18 North Koreans were expelled from the island, but it did not stop their support of the JVP, and Indian patrol boats deployed around the island were attacked by North Korean gunboats that raided the territory. Prior to expulsion, the North Koreans spent 14,000 dollars supporting the movement with propaganda. They also supplied militant equipment and instructions on making explosives and conducting guerrilla warfare.
 
In 2017, the Sri Lankan government imposed UN sanctions on North Korea. The leader of the JVP, Anura Kumara Dissanayaka, criticised the procedure, claiming North Korea is socialist and that Sri Lanka should support it.

Maintaining relations with North Korea
In 1970 a North Korean trade office in Colombo became an embassy and started its work the same year. While in Sri Lanka, North Korean diplomats cultivated links to the JVP, and the nation helped the group directly through the office. Wijeweera visited North Korea prior to the establishment of the JVP.

Iraq
The JVP sectors before the 1970s were limited to the Arab Socialist Ba'ath Party of Iraq (ASBPI). Wijeweera and Shantha Bandara visited Iraq multiple times in order to meet the members of the ASBPI. Bandara successfully formed the Inter-University Students' Federation to work as a liaison point between the two parties. When the Iran–Iraq War began, a few members of the JVP protested in front of the Iranian embassy. During the second JVP insurgency, the JVP received money from Iraq to fund the Patriotic People's Movement.

Soviet Union
The Soviet Union began to recognise the JVP in 1978 when it was no longer affiliated to the Chinese Communist Party (CCP). The Soviet Communist Party invited the organisation along with the CPSL to participate in the International Federation of Youths and Students. All financing was provided by the Soviet Union for the parties that visited the meeting upon Soviet invitation.

Ideology

The JVP's ideology changed depending on its leadership or other national and political issues within Sri Lanka or any other influential group. The JVP's mixed ideology was shaped by its origin from Maoism and transition to other forms of Marxism like Guevarism and Ho Chi Minh Thought. In the beginning, it had schisms from internal ideological conflicts.

First five lectures (1965–1983)
The first five lectures of the JVP based on class and social struggle were about the "failures" of the old left and the "path" for a new left. Wijeweera, who held anti-Indian sentiments, gave lectures against Indian irredentism. The rest of the lectures are based on economy and unemployment.

Jathika Chintanaya (1983–1989)
In 1983, the JVP's ideology was modified, as the party foresaw the consequence of inaction against Indian intelligence agencies (particularly the Research and Analysis Wing) infiltrating the national patronage. By this time it developed its own ideology named Jathika Chintanaya.

Third lecture (1994–present)
Somawansa Amarasinghe, who subsequently became the leader, modified the JVP from the roots re-socialised with other democratic groups. It refused to be affiliated nationally, but later joined some left-right alliances such as the United National Front. The organisation believes in democracy-based political lines rather than insurrectionist lines it appreciated since its conception. The JVP formed the National People's Power in 2015, which consists of various leftist groups that follow various leftist ideologies such as agrarian socialism, democratic socialism and revolutionary socialism. The current ideology of the group is democracy and anti-imperialism.

Democratic politics

Prior to the 1971 insurrection

JVP was not recognised as a political party until its first uprising. The party rejected being a democratic party following the military coup in Indonesia against the Indonesian Communist Party. It complained that the Ceylonese government would try to militarily defeat the group if it stopped arming itself. The government banned the JVP following an attack on the United States high commission in Ceylon. The government blamed the protests that led to the attack on the JVP members, but it was revealed that the attack was conducted by a Maoist organisation.

After the 1971 uprising
The brief conflict created turmoil in Sri Lanka's national politics and its international relations. Many countries were blamed for supporting the JVP, including the People's Republic of China (China) and North Korea; China denied supporting the party. As a result of the struggle, the UF government denounced the JVP in April 1971, and it became an underground organisation, though it participated in the 1978 local government elections. It refrained from attacking the government as the UF government was already facing persecution.

Entrance to elections
After the 1978 elections, the organisation's reputation among revolutionaries decreased; however, the public began to recognise it, and it quickly gained members. In 1982 the JVP participated in the District Development Council (DDC) elections and the presidential elections; it was the only radical party that contested the DDC elections in 1982.

The UNP had introduced the District Development Council as a solution to the ethnic conflict. The Nava Sama Samaja Party (NSSP), CPSL, and the nationalistic SLFP boycotted the elections, but as the JVP contested, it won a couple of seats in the council's elections. Around this time, the Election Commission of Sri Lanka formally recognised the JVP as a legitimate political party.

Persecution of the United Front
In 1978, the UNP introduced commissions to charge UF members for ignoring or violating human rights in events such as the humiliation, rape, and murder of Premawathie Manamperi. The UNP called JVP members to give evidence against the UF; the UF criticised the procedure, calling it capitalist. Afterwards, the UF members lost their civil ownership, and were not allowed to participate in the 1978 elections. As a result, the Tamil United Liberation Front (TULF) came to become the opposition, which the JVP tried to remove.

1982 presidential election

In 1982, Wijeweera contested the presidential elections. The party expected to win more than 500,000 votes but won only 275,000. Although it received more votes than Colvin R. de Silva, the party was disappointed by the results. The government banned the party again, and JVP membership dropped as people began to doubt its electoral viability.

1983 ethnic riots

After the ethnic riots, the government denounced the JVP, CPSL, and NSSP to get the UK and US' attention, claiming that the parties were involved in the Black July riots that killed thousands of Tamils. The proscription on the CPSL was lifted due to its Tamil representation, but the JVP continued to be banned.

Full-time performance in elections

After JVP leadership was eliminated by state repression during the Premadasa government, it was resurrected as a political party joining the mainstream led by Somawansa Amerasinghe – the only surviving member of the decimated JVP politburo. However, the JVP had an internal conflict: JVP supported Chandrika Bandaranaike Kumaranatunga's election campaign after withdrawing their candidate. The JVP contested the presidential elections in 1999 and their candidate Nandana Gunatilleke received 4.08% of the vote. The JVP was contested by the National Salvation Front.

The high point of the JVP's electoral effort was at the legislative elections held on 2 April 2004. The party was part of the United People's Freedom Alliance that won 45.6% of the popular vote and 105 out of the 225 seats in Parliament. As the second-largest party of this coalition, it became part of the government with 39 Members of Parliament and three cabinet portfolios.

Post-tsunami violence
Shortly after the 2004 tsunami, the JVP believed the Sri Lankan government was seeking assistance from the Liberation Tigers of Tamil Eelam (LTTE). After multiple arguments, the JVP and Jathika Hela Urumaya (JHU; Sinhala National Heritage) protested against the peace involvement from Norway. Subsequently, Tamil journalist Dharman Sivaram was assassinated. The Therraputtabaya Brigade, unknown before, issued death threats to multiple other journalists, which included former JVP member Victor Ivan.

2005 presidential election

In 2005, Mahinda Rajapaksa was elected president of Sri Lanka. Some political analysts believed that the majority of support and endorsement to Rajapakse came from the JVP due to Rajapaksha opposing the peace process. A few analysts reject this idea, saying that JVP was too weak to make an influence in mainstream elections. Other independent intellectuals, like Dayan Jayatilleka, Nalin de Silva and Mohan Samaranayake, pointed out that the Rajapaksha agreement with the JVP ensured his victory.

Internal conflict of April 2008
The party experienced an internal conflict between the two factions of Wimal Weerawansa and the party leadership in April 2008. The party decided to suspend Weerawansa's on 21 March 2008. Media reports said that Weerawansa had an argument with the leadership based on the disarmament of the Tamil Makkal Viduthalai Pulikal political party, which was attempting to participate in the country's eastern provincial council elections to be held in May 2008 under the ruling United People's Freedom Alliance.

A member of the party, Piyasiri Wijenayake, accused the UNP of conspiring against the JVP at a media conference held at Nippon Hotel in Colombo on 8 April 2008. He alleged that Ravi Karunanayake, a UNP member who had attended a meeting with senior JVP leaders at his residence, was the main conspirator. Wijenayake told BBC that his and Achala Suranga Jagoda's vehicles were forcefully removed by the group led by Jayanatha Wijesekara, a Member of Parliament from the Trincomalee district.

Weerawansa's group visited the most senior Buddhist monks of Asgiriya and Malwatte chapters on 20 April 2008 to seek blessings for their new political movement. Weerawansa also accused the UNP Kotte leaders of the conspiracy against the JVP. Weerawansa's group then formed a new political party called the Jathika Nidahas Peramuna (JNP). Party activities began on 14 May 2008, the anniversary of the day Wijeweera had formed the JVP in 1965 and of the day the LTTE killed 146 pilgrims during the Anuradhapura massacre at the Sri Maha Bodhi in 1985. The party leaders said that the new political party was an alternative to the two main political parties, UNP and SLFP, but not the JVP. In December 2008, the JNP joined the government, and claimed that the government should be supported at this moment as it was successfully fighting the LTTE in the north of Sri Lanka. JVP politicians blamed the government, saying that it had mishandled many problems, and alleged that their rivals had joined the government for personal gain.

2010 presidential and parliamentary elections
JVP formed a coalition with UNP to support Sarath Fonseka, the former army chief, in the 2010 presidential elections, but he was defeated by the incumbent, Mahinda Rajapaksa. After this, the UNP left the coalition and the JVP contested the general elections along with Sarath Fonseka's factions under the banner of Democratic National Alliance. The alliance won 7 seats, of which 4 were won by JVP candidates. The party had 39 seats before the elections.

Internal conflict in April 2012
The party had a schism in 2012 when a group of members left the party to make the new Frontline Socialist Party (FLSP). Although the FLSP was not as successful as the JVP, they still participated in elections. FLSP failed to overcome the JVP's popularity, but they remained more active by conducting protests and anti-American propaganda.

Formation of the FLSP
Premakumar Gunaratnam was an elusive leader and JVP leaders denied his existence. In April 2012, the internal crisis within the party heated up between the hard-core socialist Gunaratnam and the party leader Somawansa Amarasinghe. As a result, the party's media unit was shut down once a majority of the members extended their support to Gunaratnam. The women's wing and a majority of the students and youth wings have extended their support to the Gunaratnam group.

Several student union leaders like Duminda Nagamuwa, Udul Premaratne, and Chameera Koswatta sided with the FLSP.

2015 presidential and parliamentary elections

JVP neither contested nor directly supported any coalition in the January 2015 presidential election, but it heavily criticised incumbent President Mahinda Rajapaksa, which assisted in his defeat. Later in August the party participated in the parliamentary election and obtained six seats, receiving 543,944 votes.

2019 presidential elections 
The party went to the elections as National People's Power, and its candidate was Anura Kumara Dissanayake. He received 418,553 votes, which accounted for 3.16% of valid votes in the presidential election. Since then, the party has been called the NPP or JJB (Jathika Jana Balavegaya), but is still referred to as JVP casually.

2020 parliamentary elections
The NPP participated in the 2020 elections, and became fourth from votes. The party gained a total of 445,958 (3.48%) votes, which is the least the party gained since the second election in 1994.

Leadership

Leader

Other notable leaders

 Sarath Wijesinghe
 Victor Ivan
 Jayadeva Uyangoda
 Upatissa Gamanayake
 D.M. Ananda
 H.B. Herath
 Shantha Bandara
 Premakumar Gunaratnam
 P. R. B. Wimalarathna
 Piyadasa Ranasinghe
 Nandathilaka Galappaththi
 Gunaratne Wanasinghe

Electoral history

Offshoots
Since its creation in 1965, JVP has had several major schisms: some branches emerged as militant factions while others participated in elections. Many schisms were due to ideological changes, while others were caused by internal conflicts with other major leaders within the party.

The Viplavakari Tharuna Peramuna (Ceylon Revolutionary Youth Front) participated with the JVP and the Lanka Sama Samaja Party in a rally on May Day; it is believed to be an offshoot.
The Motherland Defense Front was a patriotic front that was formerly a coalition between the JVP and the Maoists. It was succeeded by the Patriotic People's Movement.
The Maoist Youth Front was created in 1970 as a Maoist offshoot of the JVP when a certain number of JVP members were expelled from the group. It emerged as a militant organization before collapsing after the first JVP insurrection in 1971. Its leader was Dharmasekara.
The Frontline Socialist Party was formed in 2012.
The Jathika Nidahas Peramuna or National Freedom Front (NFF) is a left-wing offshoot of non-radicals formerly part of the JVP led by former JVP member Wimal Weerawansa. To this day, the NFF is a significant minor party in Sri Lankan politics, closely aligned with the Sri Lanka Freedom Party.

See also
 List of assassinations of the Second JVP Insurrection
 Udugan Yamaya
 Ginnen Upan Seethala

Notes

References

Citations

Sources

Further reading
 
 Sri Lanka, the years of terror : The J.V.P. insurrection, 1987–1989 by C.A. Chandraprema, Lake House Bookshop (1991) 
 Michael Colin Cooke, (2011). Rebellion, Repression and the Struggle for Justice in Sri Lanka : The Lionel Bopage Story, Colombo: Agahas Publishers 
 
 'Javipe deweni karalla', ජවිපෙ දෙවෙනි කැරැල්ල, Dharman Wickramaratne, 2016
 Comrade Lionel, Dharman Wickramaratne, 2019
 An Exceptional Collapse of the Rule of Law: Told Through Stories by Families of the Disappeared in Sri Lanka, Edited by Shyamali Puvimanasinghe, researched by Moon Jeong Ho and Bruce Van Voorhuis, Published by the Asian Legal Resource Center and Asian Human rights Commission (Hong Kong) and the 'Families of the Disappeared' (Sri Lanka), 2004.
 Dr. Ruwan M. Jayatunge, 71 Karalla – aarambhaye sita avasaanaya dakva poorna samalochanayak (1971 Insurrection ‒ a complete review from the beginning to the end), Agahas Publishers, 2011.
 Victor Ivan, 71 Karalla (1971 Insurgency)
 Victor Ivan, Sinhala Karalikaruvange Samaja Pasubima (The Social Background of Sinhalese Rebels)
 Eric Gamini Jinapriya, Api Anugamanaya Kale Mao ge Moola Kandavuru Nyaayaya (We followed Mao's base camp theory) ‒ Interview with Kalyananda Thiranagama, Divaina, August 11, 2014.
 Mao Zedong, On Protracted War, marxists.org
 Godahewa Indradasa, Failed Revolts in Sri Lanka (1971 and 1987 ‒ 1989)
 Udeni Sarath Kumara, Wijeweera Hardaya Saakshiya (Wijeweera's Conscience), Niyamuwa Publishers.

External links

Official website
 English website

Youth wing

Independent sources
Rohana Wijeweera: The Killing of Sri Lanka's Stalinist Icon – BBC News
JVP in 88–89,"srilankaguardain.org"
THE 1971 CEYLONESE INSURRECTION – Fred Halliday
SRI LANKA – A LOST REVOLUTION? The Inside Story of the JVP by Rohan Gunaratna
Indian Intervention in Sri Lanka : The Role of India's Intelligence Agencies
A Lost Revolution: The JVP Insurrection 1971
Methek Kathawa Divaina 
Present Conflict (Tamil Version), Wathman Arbudaya Dutu Nodutu Pathi (Sinhala)
Review of 'Satanin Satana' – Book on second JVP insurgency to be released on 20 December, Gamana Akmeemana, Daily Mirror, 24 Jun 2019 
Book on second JVP insurgency to be released on 20 December, Friday, 16 December 2016, 
'Comrade Lionel' to be launched on November 5, Daily News, October 23, 2019 

 
1965 establishments in Ceylon
Anti-revisionist organizations
Anti-imperialist organizations
Communist parties in Sri Lanka
Guerrilla organizations
Left-wing militant groups
National People's Power
Organizations established in 1965
Political parties established in 1965
Political parties in Sri Lanka